William Harrington may refer to:
William J. Harrington, politician in Manitoba, Canada
William F. Harrington (1920–1992), American biochemist
William D. Harrington (1832–1904), Nova Scotia politician
William Harrington (Irish cricketer) (1869–1940), Irish cricketer
William Harrington (English cricketer) (1915–1988), English cricketer
William Harrington (knight) (died 1440), English knight
William Harrington (priest) (1566–1594), English Jesuit priest and Martyr
William Harrington (MP) (died 1488), Member of Parliament for Lancashire
William Harrington (artist) (born 1941), Irish artist
Bill Harrington (broadcaster) (1926–1998), American sportscaster, children's television host, and news reporter
Bill Harrington (baseball) (born 1927), American baseball pitcher
Bill Harrington (Australian footballer) (born 1942), Australian rules footballer for Footscray
Bill Harrington (Irish footballer), Irish international footballer

See also
Billy Herrington (1969–2018), pornographic film actor and model